The fourth season of the American animated television series Star Trek: Lower Decks follows the various missions and adventures of the "lower deckers" (low-ranking officers with menial jobs) on the USS Cerritos, one of Starfleet's least important starships. The season is produced by CBS Eye Animation Productions in association with Secret Hideout, Important Science, Roddenberry Entertainment, and animation studio Titmouse, with Mike McMahan serving as showrunner and Barry J. Kelly as supervising director.

Tawny Newsome, Jack Quaid, Noël Wells, and Eugene Cordero voice the lower decks crew members of the Cerritos, with Dawnn Lewis, Jerry O'Connell, Fred Tatasciore, and Gillian Vigman providing voices for the ship's senior officers. A fourth season of Lower Decks was ordered in January 2022. Writing began by that April, and voice recording started by June.

The season is scheduled to premiere on the streaming service Paramount+, and run for 10 episodes.

Cast and characters

Main
 Tawny Newsome as Beckett Mariner
 Jack Quaid as Brad Boimler
 Noël Wells as D'Vana Tendi
 Eugene Cordero as Sam Rutherford
 Dawnn Lewis as Carol Freeman
 Jerry O'Connell as Jack Ransom
 Fred Tatasciore as Shaxs
 Gillian Vigman as T'Ana
 Paul Scheer as Andy Billups
 Carl Tart as Kayshon

Production

Development and writing
Paramount+ ordered a 10-episode fourth season of Star Trek: Lower Decks in January 2022, when it also announced season renewals for the other Star Trek Universe series. Writing for the season began by that April, and was mostly completed by September.

After the success of the second-season episode "wej Duj", which had a different format than previous episodes of the series, McMahan said the writers were trying to bring those types of ideas to the whole fourth season. He later said the season would have an episode that continued from the third-season episode "A Mathematically Perfect Redemption", in which the narcissistic exocomp Peanut Hamper met the evil computer AGIMUS, but said there would not be a standalone Peanut Hamper episode in the season like that episode was. McMahan added that there would be an episode set on the planet Orion, a romantic episode, and a wedding.

Casting and voice recording
The series stars a group of ensigns serving in the "lower decks" of the Cerritos—Tawny Newsome as Beckett Mariner, Jack Quaid as Brad Boimler, Noël Wells as D'Vana Tendi, and Eugene Cordero as Sam Rutherford—and the ship's bridge crew who believe "the show is about them, but it's not"—Dawnn Lewis as Captain Carol Freeman, Jerry O'Connell as first officer Commander Jack Ransom, Fred Tatasciore as security chief Lieutenant Shaxs, and Gillian Vigman as chief medical officer Dr. T'Ana. Newsome had begun recording voice overs for the season by June 2022, when she was also doing additional dialogue recording (ADR) for the third season.

McMahan did not anticipate the positive fan reaction to second-season guest star Gabrielle Ruiz's T'Lyn when working on the third season, so she only has a small role there, but he hoped to explore her further in future seasons; he later described the fourth season as going "to T'lyn town. I want to know what she's up to."

Animation and design
Independent animation studio Titmouse provides the animation for the series, with Barry J. Kelly serving as supervising director for the season. The art team was about to begin work on the season in mid-July 2022. The animation style reflects the look of "prime time animated comedy" series such as The Simpsons, but with more detailed backgrounds and environments than is traditional for prime time animation.

Release
The season will premiere on Paramount+ in the United States and run for 10 episodes. Each episode of the series is broadcast in Canada on the same day as the U.S. release by Bell Media on specialty channels CTV Sci-Fi Channel (English) and Z (French) before streaming on Crave. Prime Video has the streaming rights for several territories, including Europe, Australia, New Zealand, Japan, and India.

References

External links 
 
 

4
Upcoming television seasons